London Buses route 59 is a Transport for London contracted bus route in London, England. Running between Streatham Hill and Euston bus station, it is operated by Arriva London.

History

Route 59 was introduced in 1999 in order to replace part of route 109 and also provide a service between Streatham and Euston station. It was and still is contracted to Arriva London.

On 10 November 2007 the route was extended from Euston to King's Cross. The move, which was intended to provide a direct link between Waterloo and St Pancras stations, coincided with the relocation of the Eurostar terminal.

On 20 December 2013, thirty people were injured when the driver of a route 59 bus swerved to avoid a vehicle and hit a tree in Kennington. Seven people were seriously injured.

New Routemasters were introduced on 22 March 2016. The rear platform remains closed at all times except from when the bus is at bus stops.

On 29 June 2019, the route was withdrawn from Euston and King's Cross.

On 23 November 2022, it was announced that route 59 would be rerouted to run to St Bartholomew's Hospital instead of Euston, following a consultation that proposed that it would run to St Paul's. This change will be implemented by the end of 2023.

Current route
Route 59 operates via these primary locations:
Streatham Hill Telford Avenue
Brixton station 
Kennington for Oval station 
Lambeth North station 
Waterloo station  
South Bank
Waterloo Bridge
Aldwych
Holborn station 
Russell Square
Tavistock Square
Euston bus station  for Euston station

References

External links

Timetable

Bus routes in London
Transport in the London Borough of Camden
Transport in the London Borough of Lambeth
Transport in the City of Westminster